Balanagar is a Mandal in Mahbubnagar district, Telangana. It is located on the National Highway 44 between Hyderabad and Kurnool.

Geography
It has an average elevation of 561 meters (1843 feet).

References

Mandals in Mahbubnagar district